Daylight Is Coming is the first non-independent album from Christian rock band Remedy Drive. The album was released on August 26, 2008, on Word Records. It peaked at No. 119 on the Billboard 200, and No. 5 on the Hot Christian Albums. On March 30, 2010, an "Extended Edition" of the album was released, with new artwork and three new tracks. The three new tracks were also organized into part of a Digital Download-only "The Daylight EP," with two additional, non-album tracks.

Track listing

Radio Singles
"Daylight Is Coming"
"All Along"
Billboard Hot Christian Songs peak: No. 10
R&R's Christian contemporary hit radio peak: No. 1
"Heartbeat"
Billboard Hot Christian Songs peak: No. 34
"Speak To Me"

Awards

The album was nominated for a Dove Award for Rock/Contemporary Album of the Year at the 40th GMA Dove Awards.

Album Credits
David Zach – lead vocals, keyboard, rhythm guitar
Paul Zach – lead guitar, backing vocals
Philip Zach – bass, backing vocals
Daniel Zach – drums
Produced by Ian Eskelin
A&R - Otto Price, Jamie Kiner, & Jason Jenkins
Recorded and Programmed by Aaron Shannon
Drums recorded by Ben Phillips @ Bletchley Park (Nashville, Tennessee)
Vocal Engineering and additional vocal production by Barry Weeks
Mixed by JR McNeely @ Elm South Studio (Franklin, Tennessee), assisted by Steve Blackmon
Mastered by Dan Shike @ Tone and Volume Mastering (Nashville, Tennessee)
Photography by Jeremy Cowart
Wardrobe & Grooming: Samantha Roe

Extended Edition Additional Track Credits
Produced by Ian Eskelin
Recorded and Programmed by Aaron Shannon @ The Holiday Ian (Franklin, Tennessee)
Vocal Engineering and additional vocal production by Barry Weeks
Drums Recorded by Ben Phillips @ Superphonic (Nashville, Tennessee)
Additional guitars by Mike Payne
Mixed by Ainslie Grosser (Franklin, Tennessee)

References

External links
Official site

2008 albums
Remedy Drive albums